Pretty Girls is the second album by Lisa Dal Bello.

Track listing

Personnel 
 Lisa Dal Bello – lead and backing vocals
 Michael Boddicker – synthesizer
 Jay Gruska – synthesizer
 Fred Mandel – organ
 Tom Hensley – piano
 Ron Stockert – piano
 Steve Porcaro – synthesizer programming
 Al Ciner – guitar
 Steve Lukather – guitar
 Richie Zito – guitar
 Dennis Belfield – bass guitar
 Ron Garant – bass guitar
 Mike Porcaro – bass guitar
 Carlos Vega – drums
 Bobby Ruffino – percussion
 Victor Feldman – percussion
 Bill Champlin – backing vocals
 Roy Kenner – backing vocals
 Bobby Kimball – backing vocals
 Liz Lausanne – backing vocals
 Michael McDonald – backing vocals
 Lisa Mordente – backing vocals

Production
 Bob Monaco – producer
 Al Ciner – producer
 Denis Degher – engineer
 Phil Moores – engineer
 Chris Gordon – engineer
 Gary Gray – engineer

References

1979 albums
Lisa Dalbello albums